The Municipality of Šmartno pri Litiji is a municipality in the traditional region of Lower Carniola in southeastern Slovenia. The seat of the municipality is the town of Šmartno pri Litiji. The municipality is now included in the Central Slovenia Statistical Region.

Settlements
In addition to the municipal seat of Šmartno pri Litiji, the municipality also includes the following settlements:

 Bogenšperk
 Bukovica pri Litiji
 Cerovica
 Črni Potok
 Dolnji Vrh
 Dragovšek
 Dvor
 Gornji Vrh
 Gozd–Reka
 Gradišče
 Gradišče pri Litiji
 Gradiške Laze
 Jablaniške Laze
 Jablaniški Potok
 Jastrebnik
 Javorje
 Jelša
 Ježce
 Ježni Vrh
 Kamni Vrh pri Primskovem
 Koške Poljane
 Leskovica pri Šmartnem
 Liberga
 Lupinica
 Mala Kostrevnica
 Mala Štanga
 Mihelca
 Mišji Dol
 Mulhe
 Obla Gorica
 Podroje
 Poljane pri Primskovem
 Preska nad Kostrevnico
 Primskovo
 Račica
 Razbore
 Riharjevec
 Ščit
 Selšek
 Sevno
 Spodnja Jablanica
 Štangarske Poljane
 Stara Gora pri Velikem Gabru
 Velika Kostrevnica
 Velika Štanga
 Vinji Vrh
 Vintarjevec
 Višnji Grm
 Volčja Jama
 Vrata
 Zagrič
 Zavrstnik
 Zgornja Jablanica

References

External links

 Municipality of Šmartno pri Litiji website
 Municipality of Šmartno pri Litiji at Geopedia

Šmartno pri Litiji